Timothy W. Carpenter (born February 24, 1960) is an American politician and Democratic member of the Wisconsin State Senate, representing the 3rd Senate district since 2003. He previously served 18 years in the Wisconsin State Assembly (1985–2003).

Early life and education
Carpenter was born on February 24, 1960, at St. Francis Hospital in Milwaukee.  He graduated from Milwaukee's Casimir Pulaski High School and attended Marquette University in 1978, before transferring to University of Wisconsin–Milwaukee, where he received his bachelor's degree in political science and history in 1982.  He continued graduate work at Milwaukee, but was interrupted when he was elected to the Legislature in 1984. He later resumed his education at the La Follette School of Public Affairs at the University of Wisconsin–Madison, where he earned his master's degree in 1995.

Political career
After graduating from college, Carpenter worked briefly at a number of jobs, at Rustlers Steak House and as a courier for Federal Express.  He had become involved with the Democratic Party of Wisconsin at an early age and became a member of the state party's administrative committee.  In 1984, at age 24, while still a student at the La Follette School, he jumped into the race for Wisconsin State Assembly in the open 20th Assembly district seat. The 20th Assembly district was heavily Democratic, based in southern Milwaukee—Carpenter faced five opponents in the Democratic primary. He prevailed in the six-way race with just 27% of the vote, and faced no opponent in the 1984 general election.

Carpenter was elected to the Wisconsin State Assembly in 1984 and served nine terms representing the 9th Assembly District until 2002, holding the post of Speaker Pro Tempore in 1993. He was first elected to represent Wisconsin's 3rd Senate District in 2002. During the 2007–08 biennium, he served as President Pro Tempore of the Wisconsin State Senate.

During the 2007-08 biennium, he was the chair of the Senate Committee on Public Health, Senior Issues, Long Term Care, and Job Creation. 

Carpenter is currently a member of the Senate Committee on Health; the Senate Committee on Transportation and Local Government; the Senate Committee on Labor, Regulatory Reform, Veterans and Military Affairs; the Senate Committee on Licensing, Constitution and Federalism; and the Joint Legislative Audit Committee 

He was also previously the Chair of the Legislative Council Study Committee on addressing recidivism in High-Risk Juvenile Offenders. 2008 Interim Study Committees

2011 Wisconsin protests

During the protests in Wisconsin, Carpenter, along with the 13 other Democratic State Senators, left the state to deny the State Senate a quorum on Governor Scott Walker's controversial "Budget Repair" legislation. Based on the revelations from a prank phone call on Gov. Walker, detailing plans to pass his bill, Carpenter called upon Gov. Walker to resign.

2020 protests
On June 23, 2020, Carpenter was recording a protest near the Wisconsin state capitol when he was assaulted by BLM (Black Lives Matter) protesters. A short time later he collapsed and was taken to the hospital for a suspected concussion.

Running for other offices

2004 U.S. House campaign 
In 2004, Carpenter unsuccessfully ran for the Democratic nomination for United States House of Representatives in the 4th congressional district, losing the primary election to fellow state senator Gwen Moore.

Milwaukee City Treasurer 
In February 2012, Carpenter was one of two State Senators (the other being fellow Democrat Spencer Coggs) to win a place on the ballot for Milwaukee City Treasurer in the Spring 2012 election, defeating former State Treasurer Dawn Marie Sass and Socialist Rick Kissell in the non-partisan primary. Coggs polled 13,559 votes; Carpenter 12,880; Sass 5,089 and Kissell 2,241. In the general election, Coggs won 35,096 votes to Carpenter's 34,293.

Milwaukee Common Council 
In 2015, Carpenter ran in a special election for the Milwaukee Common Council on August 18, 2015. A primary took place on July 21, 2015. Carpenter advanced in the primary along with Mark Borkowski, who ended up winning with 50.7% of the vote.

Personal life
Carpenter is gay, and is one of three openly LGBT members of the Wisconsin Legislature. He is a member of the Sierra Club; Jackson Park Neighborhood Association; Story Hill Neighborhood Association; and the Milwaukee VA Soldiers Home Advisory Council.

Electoral history

Wisconsin Assembly, 20th district (1984–1990)

Wisconsin Assembly, 9th district (1992–2000)

Wisconsin Senate (2002–2018)

References

External links
 Profile at the Wisconsin Senate
Senator Tim Carpenter (archive) at the Wisconsin State Legislature
constituency site (archive)
Tim Carpenter  official campaign site
 
3rd Senate District, Senator Carpenter  in the Wisconsin Blue Book (2005–2006)

1960 births
City and town treasurers in the United States
Gay politicians
LGBT state legislators in Wisconsin
LGBT people from Wisconsin
Living people
Politicians from Milwaukee
University of Wisconsin–Milwaukee alumni
Democratic Party Wisconsin state senators
21st-century American politicians
Robert M. La Follette School of Public Affairs alumni
Democratic Party members of the Wisconsin State Assembly